The Bréguet XI  was a prototype French biplane bomber of the First World War.

Development
In 1915, German fighters and well-established air defense systems made flights by French bombers extremely unsafe. French commanders therefore urgently ordered the production of new, more sophisticated bomber aircraft. Two main lines of development were devised - the development of light, high-speed and heavy, but well-protected aircraft. 

The first flight of the Bréguet XI took place in February 1916. Despite the satisfactory test results, the French military refused the aircraft, arguing that  the Bréguet XI was too large for frontline aviation.

Specifications

See also

References

1910s French bomber aircraft
Military aircraft of World War I
 0011
Trimotors
Aircraft first flown in 1916